Massep (Masep, Potafa, Wotaf) is a poorly documented Papuan language spoken by fewer than 50 people in the single village of Masep in West Pantai District, Sarmi Regency, Papua. Despite the small number of speakers, however, language use is vigorous. It is surrounded by the Kwerba languages Airoran and Samarokena.

Classification
Clouse, Donohue, and Ma (2002) conclude that it definitely is not a Kwerba language, as it had been classified by Wurm (1975). They did not notice connections to any other language family. However, Usher (2018) classifies it as Greater Kwerbic.

Ethnologue, Glottolog, and Foley (2018) list it as a language isolate, but it has not been included in wider surveys, such as Ross (2005). The pronouns are not dissimilar from those of Trans–New Guinea languages, but Massep is geographically distant from that family.

Phonology
Consonants:
{| 
|  || t || c || k
|-
|  ||  ||  || kʷ
|-
|  ||  ||  || ᵑɡ 
|-
| ɸ  || s || ʃ || 
|-
| β  ||  ||  || ɣ
|-
| m || n || ɲ  || 
|-
|  || r ||  || 
|-
| w ||  || j  || 
|}

Some probable consonant leniting sound changes proposed by Foley (2018):
 *p > ɸ
 *b > β
 *d > r
 *k > ɣ (perhaps partially)

Vowels:
{| 
| i || u
|-
| e || o
|-
| a || 
|}

Pronouns
Pronouns are:

{| 
!  !! sg !! pl
|-
! 1
| ka || nyi
|-
! 2
| gu || je
|-
! 3
| evi || ive
|}

Morphology
Massep case suffixes as quoted by Foley (2018) from Clouse (2002):

{| 
! suffix !! case
|-
| -o ~ -u ~ -a || accusative
|-
| -ɣoke || dative
|-
| -aveno || instrumental
|-
| -meno || associative
|-
| -(a)vri || locative
|-
| -ni || allative
|-
| -a || temporal
|}

Sentences
Massep sentences as quoted by Foley (2018) from Clouse (2002):

Word order is SOV.

References

External links 

 Timothy Usher and Mark Donohue, New Guinea World, Masep

Languages of western New Guinea
Kwerbic languages
Language isolates of New Guinea
Endangered language isolates